Shmuel Szteinhendler, a rabbi in Santiago, Chile, is considered the current Chief Rabbi of Cuba as well as the regional director for Masorti Olami in Latin America.

Szteinhendler was born in Argentina and trained as a Conservative rabbi in Buenos Aires. 
He started visiting Cuba regularly since 1992, operating from his base in  Guadalajara, Mexico,  and oversaw a revival of the Jewish culture there, serving as an informal spiritual head of the Jewish community in Cuba. Szteinhendler's visits to Cuba were sponsored by the American Jewish Joint Distribution Committee.

References

People from Buenos Aires
Argentine people of Dutch-Jewish descent
Argentine Conservative rabbis
Argentine expatriates in Chile
Chilean people of Dutch-Jewish descent
Chilean rabbis
Living people
Year of birth missing (living people)
Cuban rabbis